For the Winter Olympics, there were no venues that started with 1–9, seven venues that started with the letter 'A' and 12 venues started with the letter 'B'.

1–9
There are no venues that started with 1–9. This includes the 2014 Winter Olympics in Sochi.

A

B

References